Henri Joseph Anastase Perrotin (December 19, 1845 – February 29, 1904) was a French astronomer and a discoverer of minor planets. Some sources give his middle name as Athanase.

In his early career, he and Guillaume Bigourdan were assistants of Félix Tisserand at Toulouse Observatory. Later, he was the first director of the Nice Observatory in Nice, France from 1884 until his death. He made observations of Mars and attempted to determine the rotation period of Venus. He also calculated perturbations in the orbit of 4 Vesta.

In the literature, he is sometimes referred to as Henri Perrotin and sometimes as Joseph Perrotin (this is indeed one and the same person). He is also referenced in H.G Well's novel "The War of The Worlds" as "Perrotin of Nice". His 6 asteroid discoveries are credited by the Minor Planet Center to "J. Perrotin".

He won the Prix Lalande in 1875 and 1883. The Martian crater Perrotin and the inner main-belt asteroid 1515 Perrotin were named in his honor.

References

External links 
 Short biography 

 H. Perrotin @ Astrophysics Data System

Obituaries 
 AN 165 (1904) 253/254 

 Obs 27 (1904) 176 The Observatory, Vol. 27, p. 175-182 (1904)

1845 births
1904 deaths
Discoverers of asteroids

19th-century French astronomers
Recipients of the Lalande Prize